Tatjana Gorschkova  (born ) is a retired Russian female volleyball player, who played as a wing spiker.

She was part of the Russia women's national volleyball team at the 2002 FIVB Volleyball Women's World Championship in Germany, and at the 2004 FIVB World Grand Prix. On club level she played with VK Uralotschka-NTMK.

Clubs
 VK Uralotschka-NTMK (2002)

References

External links
russiavolley.com
fivb.org
bestsports.com
fivb.ch

1981 births
Living people
Russian women's volleyball players
Place of birth missing (living people)